Columbus Craft Meats (variously known as Columbus Salame, Columbus Sausage Company, and Columbus Foods, Inc.) is an American food processing company specializing in salami and other prepared delicatessen meats, founded in San Francisco in 1917. Their current headquarters are in Hayward, California. Their products are sold at supermarkets locally and nationwide, including  Costco, Safeway, Cost Plus and Trader Joe's. Their artisanal products, including specialty salumi, have been praised by food critics.

History

Italian immigrants Peter Domenici and Enrico Parducci founded what was then the San Francisco Sausage Company in 1969. The company moved their production facilities to South San Francisco in 1967. They introduced deli meats to their product line in 1974. Albert Piccetti was president of the company for 40 years, and died in 1998.

Columbus Salame hired Studio Hinrichs, in association with Pentagram, to revamp their company logo, emphasizing their Italian heritage, including use of the Bodoni typeface.

On August 28, 2009, a leak at their South San Francisco facility sent 200 pounds of anhydrous ammonia into the air, sickening more than two dozen people. The company paid $850,000 in penalties, and agreed to facility upgrades to settle a lawsuit filed by San Mateo County.

They opened a new $31 million processing facility in Hayward in 2011, replacing their former facility in South San Francisco, which had been devastated by a fire.

Endeavor Capital, a private equity firm, acquired majority control of the company in 2006. In 2012, the company was sold to another private equity firm, Arbor Investments. On November 27, 2017 Austin, Minnesota based Hormel Foods purchased the company for $850 million.

John Piccetti
Co-owner John Piccetti has coauthored a book, Salumi: Savory Recipes and Serving Ideas for Salame, Prosciutto, and More, with cookbook author Joyce Goldstein, Charcutier Francois Vecchio, and David Rosengarten.

See also

Other historic San Francisco Bay Area salame brands:
Gallo Salame
P.G. Molinari and Sons, Inc

References

External links
Columbus Foods website
Columbus Craft Meats Blog
weblog featuring a facility tour, 25 October 2011

Food and drink companies established in 1917
1917 establishments in California
Companies based in Hayward, California
Food and drink in the San Francisco Bay Area
Sausage companies of the United States
Food and drink companies based in California
Hormel Foods
2017 mergers and acquisitions